Ebrahim Qanbari-Mehr (September 1928 – ) was an Iranian musical instrument maker.

Biography 
When he was six, his father died and the family financial situation got worse, so, after passing the fifth grade of primary, at age 11 he quit school and started working at tinny, forging, machining, and carpentry. Being interested in music, after a few years he was able to learn music with Abolhassan Saba, who started teaching him to play the violin, without charge. After spending a period of notation and familiarity with the steps and techniques of Iranian and Western music, Saba suggested teaching him how to make violins. He and Saba went to meet Soren Araklyan, a Russian immigrant and the author of Monverni, and learn about his ideas and his research about music. Araklyan introduced Ganbari to the head of the Fine Arts Department, who offered him paid employment. After a year Saba died.

In 1960, Ganbari went to Watlo instrument-making school in France to develop his skills; Atin Watlo was a famous specialist in striking instruments at his time. Soviet violist David Fyodorovich Oistrakh visited the workshop, and Ibrahim Ganbari asked Walto if he could let Oistrakh play his violin; his opinion was:

"Congratulations for your eagerness, talent and perseverance which has been put into your extraordinary made violin, I've seen such a perfect instrument that has the qualities together. I wish you great success in the future" Sincerely yours, David Oistrakh Paris, 16 June 1960

Ganbari finished his master's degree in instrument-making and returned to Iran. He started to invite different builders to his workshop to work together; some accepted, including Mr. Sanaati. That way he could make more violins, some were meant for art schools and the rest were sold to enthusiasts. In 1969, the minister of art and culture of the time organized an exhibition of Iranian Instruments. At the exhibition, Ibrahim's violin was played by a very famous violist who bought his violin directly and played it in many shows.
People thought that the violin was made by Stradivari, but the violist always said: no, it's been made by an Iranian master named Ganbari.
After the 1979 Iranian revolution, he retired and kept himself busy in his small workshop at home, mostly trying to optimize the instrument's sound.

Death 
He died on 12 August 2022, at the age of 93.

References

 http://www2.canada.com/northshorenews/news/pulse/story.html?id=958127b0-9cf5-4fa3-a957-80486486cfa6

External links 
 About Ebrahim Qanbari-Mehr
 Mohammed Brothers liters, their page about Ebrahim Qanbari-Mehr.

1928 births
2022 deaths
Iranian musical instrument makers
People from Tehran